Barringtonia sarawakensis is a plant in the family Lecythidaceae.

Description
Its bark is light to reddish brown.

Distribution and habitat
Barringtonia sarawakensis is endemic to Borneo where it is confined to Sarawak. Its habitat is hill dipterocarp forest at  altitude.

Conservation
Barringtonia sarawakensis has been assessed as endangered on the IUCN Red List. The species is threatened by logging and harvesting for timber. Habitat loss from clearing for agriculture is also a threat.

References

sarawakensis
Endemic flora of Borneo
Trees of Borneo
Plants described in 1995
Flora of the Borneo lowland rain forests
Flora of Sarawak